St. Ignace Township is a civil township of Mackinac County in the U.S. state of Michigan. As of the 2010 census, the township population was 939. 

The city of St. Ignace is bordered on the south, but the two are administered autonomously.

Communities
Charles was a settlement around a mill of the Sterling Lumber Company.  It had a post office beginning in 1905.

Geography

Transportation
Interstate 75 passes through this township, with two exits in St. Ignace. Mackinac Trail, or H-63, passes through as well. The western terminus of M-134 and the southern terminus of M-123 are located here.

Demographics
As of the census of 2000, there were 1,024 people, 413 households, and 296 families residing in the township.  The population density was 10.5 per square mile (4.1/km). There were 601 housing units at an average density of 6.2 per square mile (2.4/km). The racial makeup of the township was 67.97% White, 0.59% African American, 26.46% Native American, 0.20% Asian, 0.39% from other races, and 4.39% from two or more races. Hispanic or Latino of any race were 0.39% of the population.

There were 413 households, out of which 33.4% had children under the age of 18 living with them, 55.4% were married couples living together, 11.9% had a female householder with no husband present, and 28.1% were non-families. 24.0% of all households were made up of individuals, and 7.7% had someone living alone who was 65 years of age or older. The average household size was 2.47 and the average family size was 2.89.

In the township the population was spread out, with 25.9% under the age of 18, 4.6% from 18 to 24, 27.6% from 25 to 44, 29.5% from 45 to 64, and 12.4% who were 65 years of age or older. The median age was 40 years. For every 100 females, there were 105.6 males. For every 100 females age 18 and over, there were 105.1 males.

The median income for a household in the township was $35,461, and the median income for a family was $36,023. Males had a median income of $30,750 versus $22,500 for females. The per capita income for the township was $14,768. About 7.6% of families and 11.0% of the population were below the poverty line, including 13.4% of those under age 18 and 4.3% of those age 65 or over.

Notable person
Edward Fenlon, jurist and legislator

References

Townships in Mackinac County, Michigan
Townships in Michigan
Populated places on Lake Huron in the United States